Dangerous for Your Life!  is a 1985 Soviet adventure comedy film directed by Leonid Gaidai.

Plot
Spartak Molodtsov (Leonid Kuravlyov) is a man who can not leave well enough alone. Because of this he always gets into trouble. So one morning he finds a broken high tension wire and is late for work which nearly derails the reception of visitors because his new bureaucrat-chief (Borislav Brondukov) is afraid to make decisions without him.

Molodtsov at his post meets an alcoholic of the name of Chokolov (Georgy Vitsin) and Tamara – a female van driver who transports ice cream (Tatyana Kravchenko). A visitor of the facility, Comrade Kipiani (Tamaz Toloraya), eventually finds him there, on his post, near the wire. The finale of the film is fairly unexpected.

Cast
 Leonid Kuravlyov (Spartak Ivanovich Molodtsov)
 Georgy Vitsin (Alexander Chokolov)
 Larisa Udovichenko (Katerina Ivanovna)
 Vladimir Nosik (Maxim Dmitriev)
 Tatyana Kravchenko (Tamara)
 Tamaz Toloraya (born 02.03.1951 - died 09.11.2004) (Vano Kipiani)
 Boryslav Brondukov (Andrey Pavlovich Peredelkin)
 Sergey Filippov (gentle visitor)
 Nina Grebeshkova (Zinaida Petrovna)
 Mikhail Kokshenov (lieutenant Rokotov)
 Nina Maslova (lady with the Dog)
 Vera Ivleva (born 18.09.1943 - died 08.01.1999  (barmaid)
 Alexander Pyatkov (a man in a tracksuit and with an ax)

Production
The movie was filmed in the cities of Chernivtsi and Kamianets-Podilskyi. The institution in which the main character worked was the Chernivtsi regional council building. Other filming locations in Chernivtsi include the tower in Central Square, Chernivtsi City Hall, Theater Square and University Street.

References

External links

1985 films
1980s adventure comedy films
Russian adventure comedy films
Mosfilm films
1980s Russian-language films
Films set in Moscow
Films set in 1985
Films directed by Leonid Gaidai
Soviet adventure comedy films
Films scored by Maksim Dunayevsky
1985 comedy films